Mountains on the Moon have heights defined relative to various vertical datums. In the 1960s, the U.S. Army Mapping Service used elevation relative to 1,737,988 meters from the center of the Moon. In the 1970s, the U.S. Defense Mapping Agency used 1,730,000 meters. The Clementine topographic data published in the 1990s uses 1,737,400 meters.

This table is not comprehensive, and does not list the highest places on the Moon. Clementine data show a range of about 18,100 meters from lowest to highest point on the Moon. The highest point, located on the far side of the Moon, is approximately 6,500 meters higher than Mons Huygens (usually listed as the tallest mountain).

Mountains
These are isolated mountains or massifs.

Mountain ranges

See also

List of mountains on the Moon by height
List of features on the Moon
List of craters on the Moon
List of maria on the Moon
List of valleys on the Moon
List of mountain ranges
List of tallest mountains in the Solar System

Notes

References

External links
List of named lunar mountains in Gazetteer of Planetary Nomenclature
Digital Lunar Orbiter Photographic Atlas of the Moon

Moon
 
Mountains
Lists of mountains